Oates Canyon is an undersea canyon on the continental rise east of Iselin Bank in Antarctica. Its name (approved June 1988 (ACUF 228)) is associated with Oates Coast.

References

Canyons and gorges of Antarctica